Michèle Dittlot (born 4 March 1949, Guelma, Algiers) is a Monegasque politician. She is a member of National Council of Monaco and vice-president of the Committee for the Culture and Heritage. She is a Knight of the Order of Saint-Charles, Knight of the Order of Cultural Merit, Officer of the Order of Academic Palms and Officer of the Order of La Pléiade.

Life and career 
Michèle Dittlot was born on 4 March 1949 in Guelma, Algiers. She has a certificate of aptitude for secondary education teaching in Biology and Geology and a Master of Physiology. Dittlot taught Science at school.

Since 1997 she is a member of UNAM (National Union for the Future of Monaco/Union Nationale pour l'Avenir de Monaco) political group. From 2003 to 2008 and then from 2008 to 2013 Dittlot was a member of National Council of Monaco and the President of the Culture and Heritage Commission at the National Council during both terms of office. Since 2016 Dittlot is a President of the association “Les Amis du Printemps des Arts de Monte-Carlo”.

In 2018, Dittlot was elected to the National Council of Monaco from the political group Primo! (Priority Monaco).

In 2019 Dittlot on the proposal of the National Council became a member of a Heritage Council created to preserve and promote the national heritage of Monaco. As of July 2020 she is a vice-president of the Committee for the Culture and Heritage.

Dittlot is a President of the Monegasque section at the Parliamentary Assembly of the Francophonie (APF). She speaks against the anglicisms and the advertisements in English in Monaco.

Awards and honors 
Dittlot is a holder of following orders: Knight of the Order of Saint-Charles, Knight of the Order of Cultural Merit, Officer of the Order of Academic Palms and Officer of the Order of La Pléiade.

References

1949 births
Monegasque women in politics
Members of the National Council (Monaco)
Living people
Priorité Monaco politicians